Chamdo Region or Qamdo Region was a province-level area of the People's Republic of China comprising most of the western Kham region of traditional Tibet, where the Khampa, a subgroup of the Tibetan people, live. Chamdo split from Xikang Province in 1950 after the Battle of Chamdo. Chamdo was merged into Tibet Autonomous Region in 1965.

Administrative divisions

1950–1956

See also 
 Xikang Province
 Kham Region
 Chamdo Prefecture-level City

References 

1950 establishments in China
Former provinces of China
Kham
Chamdo
1956 disestablishments in China